Francis J. McCaffrey (September 16, 1917 – November 29, 1989) was an American lawyer and politician from New York.

Life
He was born on September 16, 1917, in the Bronx, New York City. He attended Holy Spirit Parochial School and Fordham Preparatory School. He graduated from Cornell Law School in 1942. During World War II he served as an air gunner in the U.S. Army Air Force. He was an Assistant D.A. of Bronx County from 1946 to 1948. He married Irene B. O'Hara (1921–2000), and they had four children.

McCaffrey was a member of the New York State Senate from 1951 to 1956, sitting in the 168th, 169th and 170th New York State Legislatures. In November 1956, he ran for re-election, but was defeated by Republican Joseph F. Periconi.

McCaffrey was Commissioner of Records of the Surrogate Court of Bronx County until 1961, and afterwards engaged in private practice until his retirement in 1985.

He died on November 29, 1989, at his home in Riverdale, Bronx, of a stroke.

Sources

1917 births
1989 deaths
Democratic Party New York (state) state senators
Cornell Law School alumni
20th-century American politicians
Politicians from the Bronx
United States Army Air Forces personnel of World War II
United States Army Air Forces soldiers
Fordham Preparatory School alumni